Günther Eger (born 7 September 1964 in Tegernsee) is a German bobsledder who competed in the early 1990s. He won the bronze medal in the two-man event at the 1992 Winter Olympics in Albertville, France.

References
 Bobsleigh two-man Olympic medalists 1932-56 and since 1964
 DatabaseOlympics.com profile

1964 births
Bobsledders at the 1992 Winter Olympics
German male bobsledders
Living people
Olympic bobsledders of Germany
Olympic bronze medalists for Germany
Olympic medalists in bobsleigh
Medalists at the 1992 Winter Olympics